Forest is a community in Lambton Shores, Ontario, Canada, near Sarnia and Lake Huron in Lambton County.

Community 
Forest's high school, North Lambton Secondary School. This facility includes a large gymnasium, and cafeteria as well as meal preparation facilities. There are elementary schools in the public (Kinnwood Central Public School) and separate (St. John Fisher) school systems.

Recreational facilities include an enclosed arena for hockey or ringette, a community centre for dances held by the town with baseball and soccer fields, a lawn bowling club, public tennis courts, splash pad and an agricultural society with grounds used for a fall fair and occasional campsites. There are a dozen golf courses within a 20-mile drive.

Forest Amphitheatre is a natural amphitheatre located at the conservation area (Esli Dodge Conservation Area) in the south part of the town.  The stage is situated on a small island, and spectators sit on the surrounding hillsides on lawn chairs or blankets.  Hundreds attend outdoor performances there each summer.  An annual performance of a religious play (The Promise), acted in by members of the town, was held annually from 1995 to 2005. In 2006 a play entitled Their Finest Hour was performed, and since 2007 country music concerts entitled "Music In the Valley" have been held there.

The Forest Museum is located in the old Forest Home Bakery building at 8 King St. N. Permanent displays include First Nations artifacts, the military, the Forest Excelsior Band, local doctors, fashion, toys, telephones, local businesses, schools and churches. The museum was founded in 1963.

Kineto Theatre is
One of the world's oldest movie theatres - operating since 1917! Seating for 225. Concession booth. Owned and operated by the Kiwanis Club of Forest. Open every Friday, Saturday, Sunday and Tuesday.

History 
Forest is situated on what was once dense forest. When the Grand Trunk Railway was built through where the town now sits, the station was named for the dense forest. Hickory Creek, which meanders through the town, provided water for the station in those days when wood and water were essential to the operation of steam locomotives.

The first post office, in 1859, was then named Forest. The site was very near the junction of three township boundaries, with parts of Warwick, Plympton and Bosanquet townships all annexed into the town. None of these townships remain as political units due to amalgamation, with Bosanquet joining Forest in forming Lambton Shores (along with the villages of Arkona, Thedford, and Grand Bend).

The industry of the town was initially tied to the abundant fruit growing operation. There were once a canning factory and a basket factory in Forest. In more recent years the town has become a dormitory community for the city of Sarnia (and to a lesser extent London, Ontario). The extensive tourism area along the shores of nearby Lake Huron also supports several businesses. Several small factories supporting the auto industry have also opened in the past few years.

Notable people 
Brothers Dan and Thom Speck of the a cappella group The Essentials grew up in Forest.
Emily Murphy, one of the "Famous Five" who fought the "Persons Case" in the 1920s, once lived in Forest where her husband was an Anglican minister.
Ice hockey player John McIntyre grew up in Forest. He played for the Toronto Maple Leafs, Los Angeles Kings, New York Rangers, and Vancouver Canucks from 1990 to 1995.
Singer-songwriter Emm Gryner grew up in Forest.
Dublin (Ireland) -based author Roslyn Fuller grew up in Forest before moving to Europe at the age of 19.
Robyn Doolittle, journalist with the Toronto Star,  grew up in Forest. Her news stories concerning Mayor Rob Ford, including one where she described watching a video of the mayor apparently using a crack pipe, brought her international attention, particularly after the mayor's ultimate admission that he had smoked crack in a drunken stupor.
Sledge hockey player and 2014 Paralympic medalist Tyler McGregor grew up in Forest and attended North Lambton Secondary School.
Andrew Bruce Boa (1930-2004), an actor whose credits include The Empire Strikes Back and the British sitcom Fawlty Towers, lived in Forest during his high school years. His father, Rev. Andrew D. Boa, was the minister of Forest United Church from 1941 to 1950.
Marion (Boa) Woodman (1928-2018) was a Canadian mythopoetic author, poet, analytical psychologist and women's movement figure. She wrote and spoke extensively about the dream theories of Carl Jung. Marion lived in Forest during her high school years. Her father, Rev. Andrew D. Boa, was the minister of Forest United Church from 1941 to 1950.
Ice hockey player Bill Lochead was raised in Forest. He played for the Detroit Red Wings, Colorado Rockies and the New York Rangers between 1974 and 1980.
Rosalind Morris is a distinguished and trailblazing cytogeneticist and educator. Born in Wales, her family immigrated to Canada in the 1920s, settling on the 12th of Plympton (Douglas Line), just outside Forest, where they had a fruit farm. After graduating from Forest High School in 1938 with the highest marks in Lambton County, she attended Ontario Agricultural College in Guelph from where she obtained her BSA in 1942. In 1947 she became one of the first two women to graduate with a doctorate degree from Cornell University's Department of Plant Breeding. In 1963 Dr. Morris became the first woman honored as a fellow of the American Society of Agronomy. She turned 100 in 2020.

See also

 List of unincorporated communities in Ontario

References

External links
 The Municipality of Lambton Shores

Former towns in Ontario
Communities in Lambton County